Paul Lindemark Jørgensen (29 July 1916 – 2 December 1988) was a Danish competitive sailor and Olympic medalist.

He was born in Copenhagen. He won a silver medal in the Dragon class at the 1968 Summer Olympics in Mexico City, together with Aage Birch and Niels Markussen.

References

1916 births
1988 deaths
Sportspeople from Copenhagen
Danish male sailors (sport)
Sailors at the 1960 Summer Olympics – Dragon
Sailors at the 1968 Summer Olympics – Dragon
Olympic sailors of Denmark
Olympic silver medalists for Denmark
Olympic medalists in sailing
Medalists at the 1968 Summer Olympics